Ai-Da is "the world's first ultra-realistic humanoid robot". Completed in 2019, Ai-Da is an artificial intelligence robot that makes drawings, paintings, and sculptures. She is named after Ada Lovelace.

The robot gained international attention when it was able to draw people from sight with a pencil, using its actual hand, and cameras in its eyes.

Development
Ai-Da was invented by gallerist Aidan Meller, in collaboration with Engineered Arts, a Cornish robotics company. Her drawing intelligence was developed by computer AI researchers at the University of Oxford, and her drawing arm was developed by Salaheldin Al Abd and Ziad Abass, students from the School of Electronic and Electrical Engineering at the University of Leeds. Ai-Da speaks using an AI Language Model. In April 2022, Ai-Da was equipped with a new painting arm, that enabled it to paint using a palette, at the British Library in London.

Technology first 
From conception in 2019, Ai-Da was the world’s ultra-realistic humanoid robot to be able to be an artist.

Using Professor Margaret Boden's definition of creativity, namely making art that was new, surprising and of value, Ai-Da was able to devise artworks that were genuinely creative, using specially written AI algorithms in drawing and painting. She subsequently went onto doing collaboration sculpture.

Ai-Da made history at a solo show called Ai-Da: Portrait of a Robot at the Design Museum in London, with her first self-portraits, that were painted with no conscious self. How do you paint a self portrait with no self? This raises questions about identify in the digital age, and the role of our digital double as we merge with technology. She was also the first humanoid to devise a font, displayed at the Design Museum.

In October 2021, Ai-Da was invited to exhibit a sculpture at the Forever is Now exhibition at the Giza Pyramids. This is the first time art has had access to the plateau, in the Pyramids' 4500 year history.

Ai-Da was also the first humanoid to paint royalty, with a portrait of Queen Elizabeth II for her Platinum Jubilee.

In November 2021, Ai-Da used her language model to write and then recite poetry at the Ashmolean Museum, Oxford, as a human would. She did two public performances, as part of the Dante: the invention of Celebrity at the Ashmolean Museum in Oxford.

In October 2022, Ai-Da made history as the first humanoid robot to give evidence at The House of Lords, Palace of Westminster, as part of its A Creative Future inquiry, examining potential challenges for the creative industries and looking at how they can adapt as technology advances. Huge controversial press coverage ensued, because Aidan Meller stated that creativity does not need to be conscious, and because the robot inadvertently fell "asleep" during the session.

In November 2022, Ai-Da became the first robot to ever speak at The Oxford Union, the foremost debating society.

Shows and appearances
In May 2019, Ai-Da executed a live performance called Privacy at St Hugh's College, Oxford. This work was a homage to Yoko Ono’s seminal work Cut Piece.

In June 2019, Ai-Da’s artworks were featured in a gallery show called Unsecured Futures at St John's College, University of Oxford.

In June 2019, Ai-Da was invited to the Barbican Centre, London, in WIRED Pulse: AI.

In September 2019, was invited to Ars Electronica, Linz, Austria: European ARTificial Intelligence Lab exhibition entitled Out of the Box: The Midlife Crisis of the Digital.

In October 2019, Ai-Da collaborated with artist Sadie Clayton on a series of workshops at Tate Exchange, Tate Modern, London – Exploring Identity Through Technology – hosted by A Vibe Called Tech.

In November, 2019, Ai-Da was invited to do a series of workshops at Abu Dhabi Art in Manarat Al Saadiyat, UAE.

In December 2019, Ai-Da had her first in-depth interview with Tim Marlow, the Artistic Director at the Royal Academy, at the Sarabande (Alexander McQueen Foundation), London, Inspiration Series.

In February 2020, Ai-Da did her first TEDx talk in Oxford called The Intersection of Art and AI.

In July 2020, Ai-Da featured in The 1975's music video for their song "Yeah I Know", from their album Notes on a Conditional Form. In the video Ai-Da was tasked with drawing what it thought the human consciousness looked like, and composing a poem in response to the song lyrics. The album went to No.1 in the USA charts.

In October 2020, Ai-Da was featured by the United Nations in a virtual exhibition launched by The World Intellectual Property Organization (WIPO) launched "WIPO: AI and IP, A Virtual Experience."

In May 2021, Ai-Da did its first artist residency at Porthmeor Studios, St Ives. She worked in Studio 5 in response to the work of Ben Nicholson’s, who worked in same space during the 1930s and 1940s.

In May 2021, Ai-Da displayed the world’s first Self Portraits with no self, Ai-Da: Portrait of the Robot at the Design Museum, London.

In September 2021, Ai-Da exhibited her first Metaverse works at the Victoria and Albert Museum during the London Design Festival.

In October 2021, while entering Egypt for an exhibition at the Great Pyramid of Giza, Ai-Da was held for ten days by border guards who "feared her robotics may have been hiding covert spy tools". The artwork was part of the contemporary art exhibition to be held for the first time at the Pyramids in 4500 years.

In October 2021, Ai-Da exhibited artworks as part of a group show called "Dante: the invention of Celebrity" at the Ashmolean Museum, Oxford. She made history by using her language model to write and then recite poetry in the museum as a human world.

On 22 April 2022, Ai-Da launched the world premiere of her solo exhibition titled "Leaping into the Metaverse" during the 59th Venice Biennale.

In May 2022, Ai-Da's work Algorithm Queen, which depicts Queen Elizabeth II, was unveiled to mark her platinum jubilee.

In June 2022, Ai-Da was invited to be artist in residence at Glastonbury Festival, in the ShangriLa Field, along with Chinese dissident artist Ai WeiWei. Ai-Da painted the headliners Billie Eilish, Kendrick Lamar, Sir Paul McCartney, and Diana Ross while interacting with the crowds in her studio.

In September 2022, Ai-Da Robot collaborated with the Bodleian Library, University of Oxford, the Cheney School, the Rumble Museum, Open Doors and the University of Oxford Maths Department as part of an event and an exhibition called "Imagining AI". The series highlighted the ever-changing and rapid growth of artificial intelligence. Ai-Da worked with students from the Cheney School and answered questions put to her in a seminar. She also met members of the public in collaboration with Open Doors with other exhibitors that explored the area of artificial intelligence.

In October 2022 Ai-Da visited The Louvre Abu Dhabi, and later did a Keynote Talk at The Cultural Summit, Abu Dhabi with Tim Marlow, chief executive and director of the Design Museum in London, which is organised by the Abu Dhabi Department of Culture and Tourism.

In November 2022, Ai-Da was invited as guest of honour speaker at the Wadi Ashar Dialogue in AlUla, Saudi Arabia.

See also
Digital art
Robotic art

References

External links

Engineered Arts

Robots of the United Kingdom
2019 establishments in the United Kingdom
Humanoid robots
2019 robots
British contemporary artists